Thermal baths or spas in Budapest are popular tourist attractions as well as public comforts for the city's residents.

One of the reasons the Romans first colonized the area immediately to the west of the River Danube and established their regional capital at Aquincum (now part of Óbuda, in northern Budapest) is so that they could utilize and enjoy the thermal springs. There are still ruins visible today of the enormous baths that were built during that period. The new baths that were constructed during the Turkish period (1541–1686) served both bathing and medicinal purposes, and some of these are still in use to this day. Budapest gained its reputation as a city of spas in the 1920s, following the first realization of the economic potential of the thermal waters in drawing in visitors. Indeed, in 1934 Budapest was officially ranked as a "City of Spas". Construction of the Király Baths started in 1565, and most of the present-day building dates from the Turkish period, including most notably the fine cupola-topped pool.

The Rudas Baths are centrally placed – in the narrow strip of land between Gellért Hill and the River Danube – and also an outstanding example of architecture dating from the Turkish period. The central feature is an octagonal pool over which light shines from a 10 m diameter cupola, supported by eight pillars.

The Gellért Baths and Hotel were built in 1918, although there had once been Turkish baths on the site, and in the Middle Ages a hospital. In 1927 the Baths were extended to include the wave pool, and the effervescent bath was added in 1934. The well-preserved Art Nouveau interior includes colourful mosaics, marble columns, stained glass windows and statues.

The Lukács Baths are also in Buda and are also Turkish in origin, although they were only revived at the end of the 19th century. This was also when the spa and treatment centre were founded. All around the inner courtyard there are marble tablets recalling the thanks of patrons who were cured there. Since the 1950s it has been regarded as a centre for intellectuals and artists.

The Széchenyi Baths are one of the largest bathing complexes in all Europe, and the only “old” medicinal baths to be found in the Pest side of the city. The indoor medicinal baths date from 1913 and the outdoor pools from 1927. There is an atmosphere of grandeur about the whole place with the bright, largest pools resembling aspects associated with Roman baths, the smaller bath tubs reminding one of the bathing culture of the Greeks, and the saunas and diving pools borrowed from traditions emanating in northern Europe. The three outdoor pools (one of which is a fun pool) are open all year, including winter. Indoors there are over ten separate pools, and a whole host of medical treatments is also available.

Gallery

References

 Budapest Gyógyfürdői
 Király Gyógyfürdő
 Spas Budapest
 Budapest Tourism Office

Buildings and structures in Budapest